Geraldine Hakewill  (born 1987) is an Australian-raised actress, who as Geri is also a singer and songwriter. She acted as Chelsea Babbage in the Australian TV series Wanted for three seasons from 2016 to 2018 and Peregrine Fisher the titular character in Ms Fisher's Modern Murder Mysteries for two seasons from 2019 to 2021.

Early life and education 

Hakewill was born in Paris in 1987, where her parents were living while her father, Peter Hakewill, a general practitioner, was working in tropical disease management. At nine months old, her family moved to Geneva, Switzerland, and then to Chennai in south India, where they practised meditation in an ashram. Her mother Elizabeth later taught meditation. Hakewill grew up in Sydney from age four with a younger brother, Lucas. In March 1994 her father set up an Australian agency for Médecins Sans Frontières (Doctors Without Borders) to attract local doctors. When Hakewill was 14 years old her parents divorced. Her father remarried, and she has two step-siblings and two half-siblings. 

Hakewill graduated from the Western Australian Academy of Performing Arts.

Career

Acting 

She played Beth in the 2010 Australian film Uninhabited directed by Bill Bennett, and played Ella in 2011 Australian thriller Wasted on the Young. In August to September of that year she took the role of Tiny in the theatre play, Sweet Bird andsoforth at ATYP Studio. She has appeared in productions for the Sydney Theatre Company, Belvoir St Theatre and Bell Shakespeare Company. Also in 2011, she played Angela in a production of the play Heaven by Kit Brookman, performed at the Old 505 Theatre in Surry Hills, Sydney.

Hakewill secured the starring role of Chelsea Babbage in all three seasons of TV thriller, Wanted (2016–2018) for which she received a TV Week Logie Award nomination for Most Outstanding Newcomer in 2017. From 2019 she starred in Ms Fisher's Modern Murder Mysteries a spin-off of Miss Fisher's Murder Mysteries (2012–2015) TV series, which was based on Kerry Greenwood's novels. She took the lead and titular character of Peregrine Fisher for two seasons (2019, 2021). She was hoping for a third season, however as of October 2022 there has been no confirmation from its broadcaster Seven Network.

In 2019 Hakewill also had a recurring role as prison inmate Kylee Webb on the seventh season of Wentworth. At the Darlinghurst Theatre Company in that year, she played the shy character of Mari in the play The Rise and Fall of Little Voice, where she also showcased her vocal talents.

In 2021, she played Dr. Kareena Wells in ABC's eight-part psych ward drama, Wakefield. Filming had begun but bush fires during 2019/2020 pushed the production to the Southern Highlands of New South Wales, which then were also affected by fires. In March 2020 the COVID-19 pandemic shut down shooting for five months, and the cast were able to secure the government JobKeeper payments during the hiatus.

Music 

In Wanted season 2 episode 2 Hakewill, in character, sang her rendition of "Angel" originally by Sarah McLachlan. Under the moniker Geri, the artist's music career spans folk and jazz. She is inspired by musicians, Karen O and Feist. Her self-written four-track extended play (EP) You've Never Seen This Smile, was released on 28 March 2018. An EP track, "Healing" was used in the final episodes of Wanted season 3 in October of that year.

Personal life 

Hakewill met fellow actor Mark Leonard Winter in 2011, they were engaged in 2017, and married in December 2021. They live in Daylesford, Victoria. She co-starred with Winter in the 2020 film Disclosure. Hakewill announced via an instagram post on 12 September 2022 that the couple were expecting their first child. Hakewill has revealed  her anxiety, which she ameliorates by meditation, "[it] has always been a big part of my self-care mental health practices. The meditation mum teaches is called 'heartfulness', which is a raja yoga meditation: very simple, no chanting. You sit in silence and focus on the heart. I've done that since I was little." Her favourite TV series is The West Wing, her favourite movie Amélie and she dreams of one day working with actress Juliette Binoche. One of her friends is fashion designer Bianca Spender.

Filmography

Film

Television

References

External links

Australian film actresses
Living people
1987 births
21st-century Australian actresses
Australian television actresses